Pu County, also known by its Chinese name Puxian, is a county in the southwest of Shanxi province, China. It is under the administration of the prefecture-level city of Linfen; bordering county-level divisions are Yaodu District (the urban area of Linfen) to the southeast, Ji County to the southwest, Daning County to the west, Xi County to the north, Fenxi County to the northeast, and Hongtong County to the east.

Toponymy 
Pu County is named after the fabled Puzi Mountain in the area.

History

Spring and Autumn period 

During the Spring and Autumn period of Chinese history, the city of Pu and its hinterland were the appendage of the Jin prince Ji Chong'er before the Rong beauty Li Ji successfully schemed to drive him from the country in 655BC and to place her own son into succession for the duchy. Pu would have also been a home to the famous courtiers like Jie Zhitui who followed Ji Chong'er into his exile. Their court was later imposed on Jin by a Qin army in 636BC, with Ji Chong'er as the state's Wen Duke.

Northern Wei 

Post-Northern Wei 

Republic of China 

People's Republic of China 
Upon the foundation of the People's Republic of China in 1949, Pu County was placed under Linfen Prefecture, which was renamed  in 1954. The county was abolished from 1958 to 1961. In 2000, it was placed under the jurisdiction of the prefecture-level city of Linfen.

Geography 
The county's highest point is Wulu Mountain, which reaches  in height.

The  flows through Pu County, as does a number of its tributaries.

Climate

Administrative divisions 
Pu County administers four towns and five townships.

Towns 

Townships 

Demographics 
According the 2010 Chinese Census, the county had a population of 107,339, up from the 98,860 reported in the 2000 Chinese Census. The county had an estimated population of about 80,000 as of 1996.

References

County-level divisions of Shanxi
Linfen